Lentinus tigrinus is a mushroom in the Polyporaceae family. It is classified as nonpoisonous. It has been reported that mushrooms have significant antioxidant and antimicrobial activity.

References

Further reading
 

Fungal plant pathogens and diseases
Polyporaceae
Fungi of Europe
Taxa named by Jean Baptiste François Pierre Bulliard